Amine Bouanani (born 17 October 1997) is an Algerian track and field athlete who specialises in the 110 metres hurdles and also competes as a sprinter. At the 2019 African Games, he competed in the 110 metres hurdles, winning a gold medal with his personal best.

References

External links

1997 births
Living people
African Games medalists in athletics (track and field)
African Games gold medalists for Algeria
Athletes (track and field) at the 2019 African Games
Athletes (track and field) at the 2014 Summer Youth Olympics
Algerian male hurdlers
African Games gold medalists in athletics (track and field)
21st-century Algerian people
African Championships in Athletics winners
Mediterranean Games medalists in athletics
Athletes (track and field) at the 2022 Mediterranean Games
Mediterranean Games silver medalists for Algeria